Huang Xinchu (born October 1957) is a retired Chinese politician, best known for serving as the Communist Party Secretary of Chengdu between 2011 and 2016.

Biography
Huang was born Xiaogan, Hubei province. He joined the workforce in July 1976 as an elementary school teacher; thereafter, he attended Tongji University, and joined the Communist Party in October 1984. He also has a degree in political economics from Sichuan United University (now part of Sichuan University), and a doctorate in economics.

He worked at the Chengdu Engines Company as a technician, engineer, and a leader in the company's Communist Youth League wing.  He then served as CYL leader in Chengdu, and was elevator to deputy CYL chief in Sichuan province, then was promoted to chief in August 1997.  In August 2000 he was elevated to party chief of the Ngawa Prefecture, and in May 2007 named to the provincial Party Standing Committee and head of the provincial propaganda department. In November 2011 he was named party chief of Chengdu, capital of Sichuan province, and a sub-provincial city. Shortly following the 18th Party Congress, Sichuan Governor Jiang Jufeng retired due to age, and Huang was seen as one of the frontrunners to replace Jiang as Governor. However, the post eventually went to Wei Hong.

During the anti-corruption campaign in China, media outlets reported Huang's connections to businessman Liu Han, a local tycoon later executed, and Zhou Bin, son of Zhou Yongkang.  The fall of the Chengdu organization department chief, Zhao Miao, also stirred rumours about Huang. Huang's predecessor in Chengdu, Li Chuncheng, was put under investigation in late 2012.

Huang was a delegate to the 16th, 17th, and 18th National Congress of the Communist Party of China, and an alternate member of the 18th Central Committee of the Communist Party of China.

References

People from Xiaogan
1957 births
Living people
Political office-holders in Sichuan
Sichuan University alumni
Tongji University alumni